The 1937 Orizaba earthquake occurred on July 26 at 03:47 UTC, near Orizaba, Veracruz, Mexico. It had a magnitude of 7.3 on the surface wave magnitude scale. Thirty four people were reported dead. Damage was reported in Esperanza, Puebla. This was an intraplate earthquake within the subducting Cocos Plate.

See also
List of earthquakes in 1937
List of earthquakes in Mexico

References 

	

1937 earthquakes
1937 in Mexico
Earthquakes in Mexico
1937 disasters in Mexico